Mohammad Hossein Mehrazma is an Iranian footballer who currently plays for Naft Tehran in the Persian Gulf Pro League.

Club career
Alishah has played with Naft Tehran since 2009.

In July 2014, Mehrazma went on trial with Azerbaijan Premier League side AZAL.

Club career statistics

Honours
Tractor Sazi
Hazfi Cup (1): 2013–14

References

Living people
Naft Tehran F.C. players
Tractor S.C. players
Shahr Khodro F.C. players
Iranian footballers
1988 births
Association football wingers